Bruce Bould (born June 1949 in Bradford, West Yorkshire) is an English actor best known for playing David Harris-Jones in the television sitcom The Fall and Rise of Reginald Perrin from 1976 to 1979.

Career
Bould was born in Bradford, West Yorkshire, to parents who were both actors,  began his acting career aged 17 at the Birmingham Repertory, in a production of Crack in the Ice in September 1966. before joining the Royal Academy of Dramatic Art(RADA), as a student, graduating with a Diploma in acting in 1969. 

Best known for playing David Harris-Jones in the television sitcom The Fall and Rise of Reginald Perrin. His character was one of C.J.'s "yes" men, extremely shy, lacked confidence, with low self-esteem, whose catchphrases was a simple "Super!".

In 1972 he met and married actress Theresa Watson, who also starred in The Fall and Rise of Reginald Perrin, playing David's wife Prue in Series Three and Four.

Other TV credits include Z-Cars, The Good Life, The New Avengers, To the Manor Born, Shelley, Howards' Way, Drop the Dead Donkey and As Time Goes By.

Bould was a regular on stage throughout the 70's, in plays such as Clever Soldiers, in 1974 at the Hampstead Theatre Club, and A Family And A Fortune, at the Theatre Royal, Bath in 1975 with Alec Guinness.

Filmography

Film

Television

References

External links
 

Living people
Alumni of RADA
English male television actors
1949 births